Geneviève Fauconnier (Barbezieux, 3 January 1886 – Saint-Palais-de-Négrignac, 11 December 1969) was a French novelist who lived in the south of the Charente département, (France). She was one of the most sensitive members of the so-called Groupe de Barbezieux. She won the Prix Femina in 1933 with her novel Claude.

Her brother, Henri Fauconnier (Prix Goncourt in 1930) and Jacques Chardonne (Grand Prix du roman de l'Académie française in 1932) were some of the most famous writers of this group.

Complete work 
 Les trois petits enfants bleus, 1927
 Micheline à bord du Nibong, 1932 (written in 1910)
 Claude, 1933 (Prix Femina)
 Les étangs de la Double, 1935
 Pastorale, 1942
 Christine et les Micocouliers, 1948
 Les enfances du Christ, 1956
 Évocations, 1960

External links 
 Geneviève Fauconnier (in French)

1886 births
1969 deaths
Prix Femina winners
French women novelists
People from Charente
20th-century French novelists
20th-century French women writers